MINOM (formally the Mouvement International pour la Nouvelle Muséologie) is an affiliated organisation of the International Council of Museums. It is composed of professionals working in community museums, ecomuseums, museology institutes, groups focused on the organisation of local cultural activities, management and cultural mediation, and grass-rooted cultural institutions. 

MINOM's objectives are to make communities, museologists and cultural institutions aware of present major social problems, to show their connections with heritage, to organise activities relating to cultural property and to participate as a mediator in museological debates within their communities. MINOM organizes meetings and regional exchanges. 

Since 2007, its president is the Portuguese scholar Mário Moutinho. Vice-presidents: the scholars Paula Assunção dos Santos and Mário Chagas. The general secretary is Ana Mercedes Stoffel. Councillors are: Pierre Mayrand, Judite Primo and Raul Méndez Lugo. Among the honorary members are Hugues de Varine and François Leclerq.

External links
MINOM website
Interactions On Line

Museum organizations
International Council of Museums